This is a list of things named after Issai Schur.

Frobenius–Schur indicator
Herz–Schur multiplier
Jordan–Schur theorem
Lehmer–Schur algorithm
Schur algebra
Schur class
Schur's conjecture
Schur complement method
Schur complement
Schur-convex function
Schur decomposition
Schur functor
Schur index
Schur's inequality
Schur's lemma (from Riemannian geometry)
Schur's lemma
Schur module
Schur multiplier
Schur cover
Schur orthogonality relations
Schur polynomial
Schur product
Schur product theorem
Schur test
Schur's property
Schur's theorem
Schur's number
Schur–Horn theorem
Schur–Weyl duality
Schur–Zassenhaus theorem

Schur, Issai